Andrew Rhodes (born 10 October 1977) is the Chief Executive of the Gambling Commission - the UK's regulator for the gambling industry, and was formerly a senior British civil servant, occupying the largest operational director general role in the UK Government.

Early life and education 
Rhodes was born on 10 October 1977, in Neath in South Wales.  He was educated at Cefn Saeson Comprehensive School, followed by Neath College.  Rhodes studied history at the University of Wales Swansea, graduating with a B.A.(Hons) degree in 1996, which was followed by an M.Phil. in 2003.

Career 

Andrew Rhodes spoke often at events both inside and outside the Civil Service on the topic of Social Mobility and was open about coming from 300 years of coal miners, being the first person in his family to go to University and having lived in a household often dependent on benefits. His rise through the ranks of the Civil Service was very rapid - reaching the Senior Civil Service at 30, Director by 32 and occupying the largest Director-General position in Whitehall by 38.

Rhodes worked his way through university and attained his first managerial position at NTL in 2000, working as a contact centre team leader.  He then joined PricewaterhouseCoopers as a management consultant in 2001, but left the following year as the company ran into difficulty as the IT sector contracted.  Rhodes then worked for Bridgend County Borough Council between 2002 and 2005, before joining the Civil Service at the Driver and Vehicle Licensing Agency (DVLA).

At the DVLA, Rhodes became responsible for all electronic services, making DVLA one of the largest online presences in the process.  Rhodes brokered an innovative partnership with SEAT cars, which saw the car manufacturer supply 69 cars to DVLA, at no cost, over two years.  This new promotional approach was unusual in Government and was highly successful, winning both the National Business Awards in 2008 and the European Business Awards in 2009, both for Best Marketing Strategy.  By the time he left DVLA, Rhodes had been promoted to director and had held the positions of customer services director, followed by director of products and services.

Rhodes joined the Food Standards Agency as director of operations in 2010, after the merger with the Meat Hygiene Service.  This was the first time such a broad operational role had been created, effectively with responsibility for all of the UK's food safety controls.  After two and a half years at the Agency, Rhodes was appointed as the lead official and chief investigating officer responsible for responding to the 2013 horse meat scandal, later becoming chief operating officer.

In 2013, Rhodes was appointed as independent member of the Royal Air Force Air Command Audit Committee, and served for 7 years until 2020.

In 2015, Rhodes joined the Department for Work and Pensions as benefits director, soon after being given the expanded remit of benefit services director with 22,000 staff and the management of the largest virtual telephony network in Europe.

In March 2016, Rhodes was appointed to the post of Director-General, Operations, which is the largest director general position in UK Government, in terms of staffing.  Rhodes became responsible for some 72,000 civil servants, close to one fifth of the entire Civil Service, and the delivery of all benefit, pensions, employment and child maintenance services in the UK, spending c.11% of GDP at the time - over £170Bn.  On appointment, Rhodes was one of the youngest Director-Generals in the history of the UK Civil Service.  In 2017, John Manzoni, Chief Executive of the Civil Service, appointed Rhodes as the Head of the Operational Delivery Profession.  Almost constant reductions in senior posts and reduced structures meant that when Rhodes took on the role of Head of Profession alongside being Director-General, Operations, what had once been two Second Permanent Secretaries and multiple Chief Executives was now just one Director-General with a remit larger than many Government Departments and the monetary equivalent of the 47th largest economy in the world.   

In April 2018, Rhodes left the Civil Service and was appointed as Registrar and Chief Operating Officer at Swansea University, serving in the role for three years at the University he had studied at.  

In May 2021, Rhodes left Swansea University after three years  to join the Gambling Commission in June 2021, as Interim Chief Executive.  Andrew Rhodes was officially confirmed as the permanent Chief Executive Officer of at the Gambling Commission in May 2022, with the news of his permanent appointment covered in the Guardian newspaper in January 2022.    

The online gambling industry in the UK is one of the most liberalised and the largest in the world.  The Gambling Commission is the UK regulator for the gambling industry and is a Non-Departmental Public Body, formed of a Board of Commissioners with a Chief Executive responsible for the effective running of the Commission, with the Commission being sponsored by the Department for Culture, Media and Sport.  Due to the arm's length status of the Gambling Commission, although the people who work there work as part of Government, they are not Civil Servants.  

In August 2021, Andrew Rhodes was also named as Chair of the Swansea City AFC Foundation . The foundation, also renamed from the Swansea City AFC Community Trust in 2021, is a charity providing sports and outreach services in the heart of south Wales and is the charitable arm of Swansea City AFC.      

References  

1977 births
People from Neath
British civil servants
United Kingdom government information
Department for Work and Pensions
British government officials
Alumni of Swansea University
Living people